Milton Clark Avery (March 7, 1885 – January 3, 1965) was an American modern painter. Born in Altmar, New York, he moved to Connecticut in 1898 and later to New York City. He was the husband of artist Sally Michel Avery and the father of artist March Avery.

Early life
The son of a tanner, Avery began working at a local factory at the age of 16 and supported himself for decades with a succession of blue-collar jobs. The death of his brother-in-law in 1915 left Avery, as the sole remaining adult male in his household, responsible for the support of nine female relatives. His interest in art led him to attend classes at the Connecticut League of Art Students in Hartford, and over a period of years, he painted in obscurity while receiving a conservative art education. In 1917, he began working night jobs in order to paint in the daytime.

In 1924, he met Sally Michel, a young art student, and in 1926, they married. Her income as an illustrator enabled him to devote himself more fully to painting. Beginning in the 1930s, the two began developing a "lyrical, collaborative style" that Robert Hobbs described as "the Avery style".

They had a daughter, March Avery, in 1932.

Career
For several years in the late 1920s through the late 1930s, Avery practiced painting and drawing at the Art Students League of New York. Roy Neuberger saw his work and thought he deserved recognition. Determined to get the world to know and respect Avery's work, Neuberger bought over 100 of his paintings, starting with Gaspé Landscape, and lent or donated them to museums all over the world. With Avery's work rotating through high-profile museums, he came to be a highly respected and successful painter.

In the 1930s, he was befriended by Adolph Gottlieb and Mark Rothko among many other artists living in New York City in the 1930s–40s. Avery's use of glowing color and simplified forms was an influence on the younger artists.

The Phillips Collection in Washington, D.C., was the first museum to purchase one of Avery's paintings in 1929; that museum also gave him his first solo museum exhibition in 1944. He was elected a Fellow of the American Academy of Arts and Sciences in 1963.

Avery had a serious heart attack in 1949. During his convalescence he concentrated on printmaking. When he resumed painting, his work showed a new subtlety in the handling of paint, and a tendency toward slightly more muted tones.

Death
Milton Avery died at Montefiore Hospital in the Bronx, New York, on January 3, 1965, following a long illness, and is buried in the Artist's Cemetery in Woodstock, Ulster County, New York.  After his passing his widow, Sally Avery, donated his personal papers to the Archives of American Art, a research center of the Smithsonian Institution.

Style and influence

Avery's work is seminal to American abstract painting—while his work is clearly representational, it focuses on color relations and is not concerned with creating the illusion of depth as most conventional Western painting since the Renaissance has. Avery was often thought of as an American Matisse, especially because of his colorful and innovative landscape paintings. His poetic, bold and creative use of drawing and color set him apart from more conventional painting of his era. Early in his career, his work was considered too radical for being too abstract; when Abstract Expressionism became dominant his work was overlooked, as being too representational.

French Fauvism and German Expressionism influenced the style of Avery's early work, and his paintings from the 1930s are similar to those of Ernst Ludwig Kirchner. By the 1940s, Avery's painting style had become more similar to Henri Matisse, and his later works use color with great subtlety. According to art historian Barbara Haskell, "serenity and harmony" characterized all of Avery's work, especially his late work, which, "more than ever, exuded a world of low-key emotions from which anger and anxiety were absent." In her 1981 book on Avery, art historian Bonnie Grad proposed that the contemplative, lyrical quality of Avery's work should be seen in light of the tradition of the pastoral mode in art and literature.

About Avery's art
According to painter Mark Rothko, What was Avery's repertoire? His living room, Central Park, his wife Sally, his daughter March, the beaches and mountains where they summered; cows, fish heads, the flight of birds; his friends and whatever world strayed through his studio: a domestic, unheroic cast. But from these there have been fashioned great canvases, that far from the casual and transitory implications of the subjects, have always a gripping lyricism, and often achieve the permanence and monumentality of Egypt.

Art critic Hilton Kramer said, in his review of Grad's book with its sumptuous illustrations,He was, without question, our greatest colorist. ... Among his European contemporaries, only Matisse—to whose art he owed much, of course—produced a greater achievement in this respect.

Public collections

Ackland Art Museum, University of North Carolina at Chapel Hill
Addison Gallery of American Art, Andover, Mass.
Albright-Knox Art Gallery, Buffalo, N.Y.
Binghamton University Art Museum, New York
Birmingham Museum of Art, Alabama
Block Museum of Art, Northwestern University, Evanston, Ill.
Brooklyn Museum of Art, New York City
Butler Institute of American Art, Youngstown, Ohio
Cape Ann Museum, Gloucester, Mass.
Cleveland Museum of Art
Columbia Museum of Art, South Carolina
Crystal Bridges Museum of American Art, Bentonville, Ark.
Davistown Museum, Liberty, Maine 
Dayton Art Institute, Ohio
Everson Museum of Art, Syracuse, N.Y.
Fine Arts Museums of San Francisco
Georgia Museum of Art, Athens
Charlotte and Philip Hanes Art Gallery, Wake Forest University, Winston-Salem, N.C.
Samuel P. Harn Museum of Art, University of Florida, Gainesville
Harvard University Art Museums. Cambridge, Mass.
Hirshhorn Museum and Sculpture Garden, Washington, D.C.
Honolulu Museum of Art
Hunter Museum of American Art, Chattanooga, Tenn.
Kalamazoo Institute of Arts, Kalamazoo, MI
Maier Museum of Art, Randolph College, Lynchburg Va.
Maitland Art Center, Florida
Memorial Art Gallery of the University of Rochester, New York 
Metropolitan Museum of Art, New York City
Milwaukee Art Museum
Minneapolis Institute of Art
Modern Art Museum of Fort Worth, Texas
Montana Museum of Art and Culture, Missoula
Montclair Art Museum, New Jersey
Museum of Fine Arts, Boston
Museum of Modern Art, New York City
National Gallery of Art, Washington, D.C.
National Gallery of Australia, Canberra
National Portrait Gallery, Washington, D.C.
Neuberger Museum of Art, Purchase, N.Y.
New Britain Museum of American Art, Connecticut
New Jersey State Museum, Trenton
Oklahoma City Museum of Art
Pennsylvania Academy of the Fine Arts, Philadelphia 
Philadelphia Museum of Art
Phillips Collection, Washington, D.C.
Portland Art Museum, Oregon
Reading Public Museum, Pennsylvania
San Antonio Art League Museum, Texas 
San Diego Museum of Art, California
Santa Barbara Museum of Art, California
San Francisco Museum of Art, California
Sheldon Museum of Art, Lincoln, Neb,
Smithsonian American Art Museum, Washington, D.C.
Tate Modern, London, England
University of Kentucky Art Museum, Lexington
Vanderbilt University Fine Arts Gallery, Nashville, Tennessee
Vero Beach Museum of Art, Florida
Virginia Museum of Fine Arts, Richmond
Wadsworth Atheneum, Hartford, Conn.
Walker Art Center, Minneapolis
Westmoreland Museum of American Art, Greensburg, Penn.
Woodstock Artists Association and Museum, New York
Bruce Museum, Greenwich, Connecticut

Notes

References
Breeskin, Adelyn. Milton Avery. New York: American Federation of Arts, 1960.
Breeskin, Adelyn. Milton Avery. Washington: The National Collection of Fine Arts, 1969.
Chernow, Bert. Milton Avery: a singular vision: [exhibition], Center for the Fine Arts, Miami. Miami, Florida: Trustees of the Center for the Fine Arts Association. 1987. 
Grad, Bonnie Lee. Milton Avery Monotypes. Princeton University Library, 1977.
Grad, Bonnie Lee. Milton Avery. Foreword by Sally Michel Avery. Royal Oak, Michigan: Strathcona, 1981.
Haskell, Barbara. Milton Avery: The Metaphysics of Color, Westchester, NY: Neuberger Museum of Art, 1994.
Haskell, Barbara. Milton Avery. New York: Harper & Row Publishers in association with the Whitney Museum of American Art, New York, 1982.
Hobbs, Robert  (2007). Milton Avery. Hudson Hills Press. , 
Hobbs, Robert  (2001). Milton Avery: The late paintings. New York: Harry N. Abrams. 
Johnson, Una E. Milton Avery Prints and Drawings 1930-1960. New York: Brooklyn Museum, 1966.
Kramer, Hilton. Milton Avery: Paintings 1930-1960. New York: Thomas Yoseloff, 1962.
Kramer, Hilton. Avery: Our Greatest Colorist. New York Times, April 12, 1981.
ART USA NOW Ed. by Lee Nordness;Vol.1, (The Viking Press, Inc., 1963.) pp. 66–69
Wilkin, Karen, Milton Avery: Paintings of Canada. 
Archives of American Art
Oral history interview with Sally Avery, 1982 Feb. 19
Oral history interview with Sally Michel Avery, 1967 Nov. 3

External links
 Milton Avery Gallery
 
 A finding aid to the Milton Avery Papers, 1926-1982, bulk 1950-1982 in the Archives of American Art, Smithsonian Institution
 Milton Avery Graduate School of the Arts, Bard College
Avery, Our Greatest Colorist; Hilton Kramer; New York Times; April 12, 1981

1885 births
1965 deaths
20th-century American painters
American male painters
Modern painters
Landscape artists
Art Students League of New York alumni
Fellows of the American Academy of Arts and Sciences
People from Oswego County, New York
20th-century American printmakers
20th-century American male artists